
Gmina Wolbórz is an urban-rural gmina (administrative district) in Piotrków County, Łódź Voivodeship, in central Poland.

It was formerly classed as a rural gmina, becoming urban-rural when Wolbórz was given town status on 1 January 2011.

The gmina contains part of the protected area called Sulejów Landscape Park.

Villages
Apart from the town of Wolbórz, Gmina Wolbórz contains the villages and settlements of Adamów, Apolonka, Bogusławice, Bronisławów, Brudaki, Dębsko, Golesze Duże, Golesze Małe, Golesze-Parcela, Janów, Kaleń, Kolonia Dębina, Komorniki, Krzykowice, Kuznocin, Leonów, Lubiaszów, Lubiatów, Lubiatów-Zakrzew, Marianów, Młoszów, Młynary, Polichno, Proszenie, Psary Stare, Psary Witowskie, Psary-Lechawa, Stanisławów, Studzianki, Świątniki, Swolszewice Duże, Węgrzynów, Żarnowica Duża, Żarnowica Mała and Żywocin.

Neighbouring gminas
Gmina Wolbórz is bordered by the city of Piotrków Trybunalski and by the gminas of Będków, Mniszków, Moszczenica, Sulejów, Tomaszów Mazowiecki and Ujazd.

References

Polish official population figures 2006

Wolborz
Piotrków County